Butyriboletus primiregius is a pored mushroom  in the family Boletaceae. Found in California, where it grows in a mycorrhizal association with fir (genus Abies), it was described as new to science in 2014.

See also
List of North American boletes

References

External links

primiregius
Fungi described in 2014
Fungi of the United States
Fungi without expected TNC conservation status